Amington Parish Church (dedicated to St Editha) is a Grade II listed parish church in the Church of England in Amington.

History

The church was built in 1864 by the architect George Edmund Street. It is noted for its stained glass windows by Edward Burne-Jones.

Today
The church is part of the Diocese of Birmingham, the archdeaconry of Aston, The Deanery of Polesworth and is in the parish of Amington. The vicar is currently Revd. Ben Green.

Services take place every Sunday at 10:30am (contemporary) and 6:30pm (sung BCP Evening Prayer), and every other week there is a BCP Holy Communion service at 8:30am.  Additionally there is a service of Wholeness and Healing on the second Monday of every month, at 7:30pm.

Every Thursday morning during term-time the church is open for a Stay Play and Pray group called The Ark.

Every Thursday throughout the year, between 2pm and 4pm, the church is open as part of the national Places of Welcome scheme.

Full details of all current activities can be found on the church's website.

Organ

The church has an organ which originally was built by George Holdich. A specification of the organ can be found on the National Pipe Organ Register.

See also
Listed buildings in Tamworth, Staffordshire

References

Church of England church buildings in Staffordshire
Grade II listed churches in Staffordshire
Churches completed in 1864
G. E. Street buildings